Onychogomphus pilosus is a species of dragonfly in the family Gomphidae. It is found in Ethiopia, Kenya, and Tanzania.

References

Gomphidae
Taxonomy articles created by Polbot
Insects described in 1912